Dundee is a census-designated place and unincorporated community in Tunica County, Mississippi, United States. Dundee has a post office with ZIP code 38626. 

It was first named as a CDP in the 2020 Census which listed a population of 73.

History
The village was founded in 1884 after the Louisville, New Orleans and Texas Railway was built, and was originally called Carnesville, for Captain J.B. Carnes, a principal landowner in the county.

A post office was established in 1887, though a similarly-named Carnesville required a change of names. "Dundee" was selected from a list.  Dundee was incorporated in 1920 by Gubernatorial (Governor's) Proclamation.

Dundee served as a transportation hub, and a railroad depot was built circa 1895. Blues musician W. C. Handy once played on the depot's wooden platform as crowds danced. In 2011, the depot—the last in Tunica County—was moved to Robinsonville, where it was restored and made into a visitors center.  The "Highway 61 North" Mississippi Blues Trail marker is located in front of the depot.

Education
Residents are a part of the Tunica County School District. Zoned schools include Dundee Elementary School, Tunica Middle School, and Rosa Fort High School.

Demographics

2020 census

Note: the US Census treats Hispanic/Latino as an ethnic category. This table excludes Latinos from the racial categories and assigns them to a separate category. Hispanics/Latinos can be of any race.

Notable people
 Sam Carr, drummer for The Jelly Roll Kings; raised in Dundee.
 Dub Garrett, American football player
 Oliver Sain, musician.

Gallery

References

External links
 Highway 61 North Blues Trail marker

Unincorporated communities in Tunica County, Mississippi
Unincorporated communities in Mississippi
Census-designated places in Tunica County, Mississippi
Memphis metropolitan area